Pseudosasa is a genus of East Asian bamboo in the grass family.

These species are small to medium running plants, usually with one branch at a node. Its name comes from its resemblance to the genus Sasa. The species are native to China, Japan, Korea, and Vietnam, with a few species sparingly naturalized in various other regions (western Europe, North Africa, North America, New Zealand, etc.

Species

formerly included
see Acidosasa Fargesia Gelidocalamus Indocalamus Oligostachyum Pleioblastus Sasa] Sasaella Sasamorpha Sinobambusa Yushania

References

Bambusoideae
Bambusoideae genera
Flora of China
Flora of Eastern Asia
Flora of Vietnam